Bois-d'Amont is a municipality in the district of Sarine in the canton of Fribourg in Switzerland. On 1 January 2021 the former municipalities of Arconciel, Ependes and Senèdes merged to form the new municipality of Bois-d'Amont.

History

Arconciel
Arconciel is first mentioned in 1082 as castrum Arconciacum.  The municipality was formerly known by its German name Ergenzach, however, that name is no longer used.

Épendes
Épendes is first mentioned in 1142 as Spindes.

Senèdes
Senèdes is first mentioned in 1233 as Senaide.

Geography

Demographics

Historic population
The historical population is given in the following chart:

Heritage sites of national significance
The Farm House at La Souche 1, the mesolithic shelter at La Souche and the medieval village at Vers-le-Château are listed as Swiss heritage site of national significance.

References

Municipalities of the canton of Fribourg
Cultural property of national significance in the canton of Fribourg